= Loose forward =

Loose forward may refer to playing positions in both rugby football sports:

- Rugby league positions, in rugby league football
- Rugby union positions, in rugby union football
